Jeffrey Parker (born July 16, 1969) is a former American football wide receiver who played for the Tampa Bay Buccaneers of the National Football League (NFL). He played college football at Bethune-Cookman University.

References 

Living people
1969 births
American football wide receivers
Bethune–Cookman Wildcats football players
Tampa Bay Buccaneers players